Blackburn Rovers F.C. were in Division One for the 1999–2000 season, having been relegated from the FA Premier League after seven years. The expected comeback to the top flight did not materialise, in spite of several expensive purchases staying at the club. Brian Kidd was sacked on 3 November 1999 after 11 months in charge, with Rovers 19th in the league despite more than £30 million having been spent on players in that time. Long-serving coach Tony Parkes was placed in temporary charge of the team as the search for a successor began. Former defender Colin Hendry, who had been part of the title winning team in 1995 and who had started his first spell at Ewood Park in the 1980s, was linked with a return to the club as player-manager. Other names linked with the vacancy included Graeme Souness, Colin Todd, Roy Evans and Joe Kinnear.

The appointment of Graeme Souness on 15 March 2000 gave renewed hopes of a resurgence in 2000–01. Blackburn finished 11th in the final table.

Squad
Squad at end of season

Left club during season

Final league table

Results

Pre-season

Division One

League Cup

FA Cup

Topscorers

League
  Lee Carsley 10
  Egil Østenstad 8
  Ashley Ward 8
  Matt Jansen 4
  Damien Duff 4

References

  Blackburn – Soccerbase.com

Blackburn Rovers F.C. seasons
Blackburn